A list of films produced by the Turkish film industry in Turkey in 2016.

2005